Optatus or Opatat was a common given name in the Roman times. Its etymology is probably derived from the Roman religion.

People with the name 
Optatus of Carthage
Optatus of Thamugadai
Optatus of Vescera

References